Deogratias Musoke (born 20 July 1949) is a Ugandan boxer. He competed in the men's featherweight event at the 1972 Summer Olympics.

References

1949 births
Living people
Ugandan male boxers
Olympic boxers of Uganda
Boxers at the 1972 Summer Olympics
Boxers at the 1970 British Commonwealth Games
Commonwealth Games silver medallists for Uganda
Commonwealth Games medallists in boxing
Place of birth missing (living people)
Featherweight boxers
Medallists at the 1970 British Commonwealth Games